Separation anxiety disorder is a psychological condition.

Separation Anxiety may also refer to:

Separation anxiety in dogs, in which a dog exhibits distress when separated from its handler

Television and film
Separation Anxiety (TV series), a 2016 American game show
"Separation Anxiety" (Homeland), a 2015 TV episode
"Separation Anxiety" (The King of Queens), a 2001 TV episode
"Separation Anxiety" (That's So Raven), a 2003 TV episode
Separation Anxiety, a 2008 film by Kelly Glenn Williams

Other uses
Separation Anxieties, a 2000 album by 12 Rods
Separation Anxiety, a 2009 mixtape by Cadence Weapon
Venom: Separation Anxiety, a 1994–1995 comic book series
Venom/Spider-Man: Separation Anxiety, a 1995 video game based on the comics